A U-turn transaction, generally speaking, is a banned financial transaction done by a bank in country A (example: USA) for the benefit of a bank in country B (example: Iran) through offshore banks (example: Switzerland). This loophole is used by Iranian banks to avoid U.S. sanctions for their US dollar based transactions. The phrase "U-turn" applies because the funds are transferred to a U.S. bank and instantly turned back as dollars to a European bank.

References

Banking
Offshore finance